F. grandis may refer to:
 Fundulus grandis, the Gulf killifish, a fish species in the genus Fundulus
 Falcivibrio grandis, a bacterium species in the genus Falcivibrio

See also
 Grandis (disambiguation)